Alexander Robert Entrican  (28 January 1898 – 21 April 1965), commonly known as Pat Entrican, was a New Zealand civil engineer and forestry administrator. He was born in Devonport, Auckland, New Zealand, on 28 January 1898.

In 1953, Entrican was awarded the Queen Elizabeth II Coronation Medal. In the 1955 Queen's Birthday Honours, he was appointed a Commander of the Order of the British Empire.

References

1898 births
1965 deaths
New Zealand foresters
New Zealand Commanders of the Order of the British Empire
New Zealand civil engineers
20th-century New Zealand engineers
People from Auckland
Pat